Chuvashia, officially the Chuvash Republic — Chuvashia, is a republic of Russia located in Eastern Europe. It is the homeland of the Chuvash people, a Turkic ethnic group. Its capital is the city of Cheboksary. As of the 2010 Census, its population was 1,251,619.

Geography
The Chuvash Republic is located in the center of European Russia, in the heart of the Volga-Vyatka economic region, mostly to the west of the Volga River, in the Volga Upland. It borders with the Mari El Republic in the north, Nizhny Novgorod Oblast in the west, the Republic of Mordovia in the southwest, Ulyanovsk Oblast in the south, and the Republic of Tatarstan in the east and southeast. There are over two thousand rivers in the republic—with the major ones being the Volga, the Sura, and the Tsivil—as well as four hundred lakes. Some of the Volga River valley reservoirs are in the north of the republic, and the Sura River flows towards the Volga along much of the republic's western boundary. 

Natural resources include gypsum, sand, clay, sapropel deposits, phosphorite, and peat. There are oil and natural gas deposits, although their extraction has not yet been commercially pursued. Forests, mostly in the south along the Sura River, cover approximately 30% of the land.

History

The ancestors of the Chuvash were Bulgars and Suars, Turkic tribes residing in the Northern Caucasus in the 5th to 8th centuries. In the 7th and 8th centuries, a part of the Bulgars left for the Balkans, where, together with local Slavs, they established the state of modern Bulgaria. Another part moved to the Middle Volga Region (see Volga Bulgaria), where the Bulgar population that did not adopt Islam formed  the foundation of the Chuvash people.

During the Mongol invasion of Volga Bulgaria, the steppe-dwelling Suar migrated north, where Volga Finnic tribes, such as the Mordvins and Mari lived. The Chuvash claim to be the descendants of these Suars who assimilated with the Mari. In 1242, they became vassals of the Golden Horde. Later Mongol and Tatar rulers did not intervene in local internal affairs as long as tribute was paid annually to Sarai. When the power of the Golden Horde began to diminish, local Mişär Tatar Murzas from Piana and Temnikov tried to govern the Chuvash area.

During Ivan the Terrible's  war of conquest against the Khanate of Kazan, in August 1552, the Chuvash Orsai and Mari Akpar Tokari princes swore their loyalty to the Grand Duchy of Muscovy at Alatyr on the Sura River. Between 1650 and 1850, the Russian Orthodox Church sent Chuvash-speaking missionaries to try to convert the Chuvash to the Orthodox faith. A group of these missionaries created a written Chuvash language. Most of the Chuvash who stayed in the area became Orthodox Christians, but some remained pagan.

On May 15, 1917, the Chuvash joined the Idel-Ural Movement and in December 1917 joined the short-lived Idel-Ural State, when an agreement was reached with Tatar representatives to draw the eastern border of Chuvashia at the Sviyaga River. In 1918–1919, the Russian Civil War encompassed the area. This ended with victory for the Bolsheviks. To gain support from the local population, Lenin ordered the creation of a Chuvash state within the Russian SFSR. On June 24, 1920, the Chuvash Autonomous Oblast was formed, which was transformed into the Chuvash ASSR in April 1925.

Administrative divisions

Politics

Until 2012, the Chuvash Republic officially had the status of a state.  In the constitution of Chuvashia (version 6 - dated September 13, 2011 No. 46), the following was fixed: "The Chuvash Republic is a republic (state) within the Russian Federation."

During the Soviet period, the high authority in the republic was shared between three persons: The first secretary of the Chuvashia CPSU Committee (who in reality had the biggest authority), the chairman of the oblast Soviet (legislative power), and the Chairman of the Republic Executive Committee (executive power). Since 1991, CPSU lost all the power, and the head of the Republic administration, and eventually the governor was appointed/elected alongside elected regional parliament.

The Charter of Republic of Chuvashia is the fundamental law of the region. The State Council of the Chuvash Republic is the republic's regional standing legislative (representative) body. The highest executive body is the Republic's Government, which includes territorial executive bodies such as district administrations, committees, and commissions that facilitate development and run the day to day matters.

Demographics
Despite not being large, the republic is one of the most densely populated regions in the Russian Federation. Population: 

The capital (and largest city) is Cheboksary (population 464,000 in 2010). Nearby to the east is the next largest city, Novocheboksarsk (population 124,000 in 2010).

Settlements

Vital statistics

Source: Russian Federal State Statistics Service 

Note: TFR

Ethnic groups
According to the 2010 Census, ethnic Chuvash make up 67.7% of the republic's population. Other groups include Russians (26.9%), Tatars (2.8%), Mordvins (1.1%), and a host of smaller groups, each accounting for less than 0.5% of the total population.

Genetics 
Osteopetrosis affects 1 newborn out of every 20,000 to 250,000 worldwide, but the odds are much higher in the Russian region of Chuvashia (1 of every 3,500–4,000 newborns) due to genetic traits of the Chuvash people.

Religion

According to a 2012 survey, 64.7% of the population of Chuvashia adheres to the Russian Orthodox Church, 4% are Orthodox Christian believers without belonging to any church or members of non-Russian Orthodox churches, 3% of the population (mostly Tatars) follow Islam, 3% are unaffiliated Christians, 1% follow indigenous faiths (Vattisen Yaly, Chuvash folk religion). In addition, 24% of the population declares to be "spiritual but not religious", 1% is atheist and 2.3% follows other religions or did not answer to the question. There is a growing population of Jehovah's Witnesses among the people despite the official ban by the Russian Government.

Study of religion is compulsory for schoolchildren in Chuvashia. Of the students, approximately 76.9% are enrolled for Orthodox Studies, 16.0% for Secular Studies, 15.7% for World Religions Studies and 1.4% for Islamic Studies.

Education
There are five higher educational institutions, including the Chuvash State University, the Chuvash State Pedagogical Institute, and the Chuvash State Agricultural Academy located in Cheboksary. These, together with 28 colleges and technical schools, are currently attended by approximately 45,000 students.

Economy

The Chuvash Republic is the most populous and fertile area in the middle Volga region. There are deciduous woodlands on fertile black earth. In agriculture, wheat and sugar-beet, pigs and beef cattle have become more important than the rye, oats, barley and dairy cattle which are typical for the whole area.

The republic is Russia's center for growing hops and is famous throughout the country for its long history of beer brewing. It is also a major center for electrical engineering, especially in the area of power transmission and control systems. Other leading industries are metalworking, electricity generation, and chemical manufacturing. There are also large timber-working mills at Shumerlin.

The largest companies in the region include Khimprom Novocheboksarsk (revenues of $ million in 2017), Accond (confectionery maker$,  million), Cheboksary Instrument-Making Plant ($ million), NPP EKRA (power engineering$,  million).

Transportation
The transport network in the republic is one of the most developed in Russia. The republic's system of roads, railroads, waterways, and airports closely ties the region with others in and outside of Russia.

Roads
Only four roads in the Chuvash Republic are classified as important federal highways. The most important is Highway M-7, which runs from Nizhny Novgorod through the northern parts of the republic from Yadrinsky Nikolskoye via Malye Tyumerli, Kalmykovo, Khyrkasy, Novye Lapsary, Kugesi, Shivlinsk, Staraya Tyurlema, to Kazan in the Republic of Tatarstan. It also forms a connection via Chuvashia through the southern suburbs of Cheboksary and Novocheboksary to the Mari El Republic and the Vyatka Highway. Part of this road is classified as a motorway, the only one in the republic. From Yadrinsky Nikolskoye, the federal road P-178 runs through Yadrin, Shumerlya, Alatyr, to Surskoye in Ulyanovsk Oblast and further to Ulyanovsk. In the eastern part of Chuvashia, the federal road A-151 runs from Tsivilsk through Kanash, Komsomolskoye, Chkalovskoye, Karabay-Shemursha, Shemursha to Ulyanovsk and Saratov. All other roads in Chuvashia are classified as local area roads.

Automobiles, trucks, and buses are the major forms of transportation, with the republic ranking fourth in highway density in all of Russia. Cheboksary is situated on one of the main highways of the Russian Federation leading from Moscow to the industrial areas of Tatarstan, the southern Urals, and Siberia. A recently completed bridge across the Volga River in the north connects the republic to the developed Ural and Volga Federal Districts. To the south, highways connect Chuvashia with Saratov and Volgograd. Extensive public and private bus systems connect all towns within the republic with each other and with the surrounding regions.

The average time of delivery from Cheboksary to Moscow is 1.5 days; to Saint Petersburg, 2.5 days; and to Western Europe, 10 to 15 days.

Railways
The railway network is highly developed, convenient, and accessible year-round. One of the largest railway junctions of Russia – Kanash—is in the center of the republic. Via Kanash, the rail system connects the major towns in Chuvashia with the big industrial centers of eastern Siberia, the Urals, and Moscow. Express trains are reliable and provide a low-cost, comfortable way to travel. Express trains to and from Moscow are available every day, with the overnight journey taking approximately fourteen hours each way.

The following lines serve railway traffic in the Chuvash Republic:
Arzamas-Kanash line
Krasny Usel – Kanash -Sviyazhsk line
Kanash – Cheboksary II – Cheboksary I – Cheboksary II – Novocheboksarsk line

All railway lines in Chuvashia are operated by the MPS Gorky Railway Division. Steam locomotives were mostly replaced in 1970 by diesel locomotives and when the main Arzamas-Kanash-Sviyazhsk line was electrified, the diesel locomotives were replaced by electric ones.

The Arzamas-Kanash-Sviyazhsk line is a double track main line, while the others are single track lines. The 84 km (52 mi) Sviyazhsk-Kanash section was electrified in 1986, the 142 km (88 mi) Kanash-Sergach section in 1987.

In 1967, there were four daily passenger trains in both directions on the Alatyr-Kanash line. One of them was the semifast Sochi-Sverdlovsk-Sochi long-distance transit train, halting only at Alatyr, Buinsk, and Kanash. Cheboksary was connected by daily semifast passenger train to Moscow. The travel time was 17.30 hours for the 758 km (471 mi) journey.  21 express and passenger trains used the Arzamas-Kanash-Sviyazhsk main line in the summer high season in both directions. Of these, four did not halt in Chuvashia. Most of the remaining semifast trains stopped at Shumerlya, Piner, Burnary, and Kanash. Four pairs of semifast trains also stopped at Tyurmari. In the 1999–2000 timetable, 11 pairs of Moscow-Kanash-Kazan express trains stopped at Kanash. The Chuvashia 53/54 express trains between Moscow and Kanash took 11.23 hours, back 10.57 hours.

In addition to Russian  gauge railways, there were six  narrow gauge railway lines: two short peat briquette industry lines at Severny and Sosnovka on the north side of the Volga, and four forest railways at Shumerlya, Atrat and Kirya. All opened in the 1930s. In 1965, their total length was :
Shumerlya-Kabanovo-Rechnoy-Burak-Krasnobar forest railway – total length 
Shumerlya-Kumashka-Salantshik-Yakhaykino forest railway – 
Kirya-Lesopunkt Lyulya forest railway – 
Atrat-Dolnaya Polyana-Lesozavod Gart forest railway – 

All lines were closed in the economic uncertainty after the breakup of the Soviet Union.

Rivers

The Volga and Sura Rivers connect Chuvashia to a national and international water network. To the south, Volgograd, Rostov-on-Don, Astrakhan, the Caspian Sea, and Black Sea are directly reachable. To the west, the Volga River connects Cheboksary with Nizhny Novgorod, Yaroslavl, Moscow and the northern regions of Russia. By using river-sea vessels, cargo transportation is possible from Chuvash river ports all the way to Saint Petersburg, Novorossiysk (on the Black Sea), Astrakhan, and ports situated on the Danube River. However, the river is frozen from December through April. Cheboksary is a frequent stop on the many boat tours of the Volga.

Air
The international Cheboksary Airport receives both cargo and passenger aircraft of practically all types and sizes. There are regularly scheduled flights to Moscow and other destinations. Additionally, Cheboksary is about a four-hour drive from Strigino International Airport, the airport primarily serving Nizhny Novgorod, which offers a greater number of flights, including connections through Aeroflot and Belavia.

Culture
While Russian is the predominant business language, the Chuvash language is still spoken by many, especially in the country. The Chuvash language belongs to the Oghur subgroup of the Turkic language group. In ancient times a runic system of writing was used. Chuvashi now uses a modified Cyrillic script that was adopted in 1871.

There has been a resurgence of native Chuvash pride, with many people looking back to their Chuvash roots and exploring the culture and heritage and relearning the language. Most building signs, road signs, and announcements are in both Russian and Chuvash.

At present Chuvash Republic has six professional theaters:

Chuvash State Opera and Ballet Theater
Chuvash State Academic Drama Theater
Chuvash State Academic Song and Dance Ensemble
Chuvash Children's Theater
Chuvash State Puppet Theater
Chuvash State Philharmonic Society
Russian State Drama Theater
Chuvash State Youth Theater
Chuvash State Experimental Drama Theater

and over 30 amateur theaters, a Philharmonic Society, an Academic Folk Song and Dance Group, an Academic Choir, a Chamber Orchestra, and some professional concert groups.

There are also more than 20 museums, exhibition halls and modern art galleries.

Chuvash National Museum.
Art Museum
Museum of Vasily Chapayev
Literature Museum named after K.Ivanov
Museum and Exhibition Center
Culture and Exhibition Center «Raduga»
Chuvash Beer Museum
Chuvash State Geological Museum
Museum of Cheboksary
Space Museum
Art Gallery
Contemporary Art Center
Art Gallery «6Х7»

Chuvash Republic has more than 565 public libraries, the book collection being over 10 million units.
The Chuvash National Library

Monuments of Architecture

There are about 627 monuments of architecture in Chuvashia, including 54 of national importance: the Vvedensky Cathedral (1657), the Holy Trinity Monastery (1566), the Salt House, the houses of Chuvash famous merchants (Zeleischikov, Solovtsov, the Efremov family) (18th-19th century) in Cheboksary, the Tolmachev family house and Trinity Cathedral (18th century) in the town of Tsivilsk, the Burashnikov house in the town of Yadrin.

Surhuri is the Chuvash national holiday.

Sport
Chuvashia, along with Mordovia, has given some of the best modern race walkers, as Vera Sokolova, Olimpiada Ivanova, Yelena Nikolayeva and Vladimir Andreyev. Additionally, the 2008 IAAF World Race Walking Cup was held in Cheboksary.

Creative unions 
 Union of the Writers of the Chuvash Republic

Radio
Chuvash national radio
Radio of Chuvashia

See also 
 Chuvash national symbols

Notes

References

Sources

Further reading

External links

Official website of the Chuvash Republic
About flag and coat of arms of the Chuvash Republic
Chuvashia news
Why do Chuvash people not speak  in Chuvash? (article in Russian)
"As it is in the Chuvash Republic the Chuvash are not needed?!"

 
States and territories established in 1925
Members of the Unrepresented Nations and Peoples Organization
1925 establishments in the Soviet Union
Russian-speaking countries and territories
Regions of Europe with multiple official languages